Sir Ralph Howard, 1st Baronet (1801 – 15 August 1873) was an Irish Whig politician and army officer.

Family
Howard was the first son of Hugh Howard and Catherine née Bligh, daughter of Robert Bligh. He was also the grandson of Ralph Howard, 1st Viscount Wicklow, and brother-in-law of Granville Proby, 3rd Earl of Carysfort. Educated at Eton College from 1817, and Brasenose College, Oxford, from 1819, he married, in 1817, Charlotte Anne Crauford, daughter of Daniel Craufurd, and widow of James John Fraser.

Political career

With the approval and "no objection whatever" of Charles Wentworth-Fitzwilliam, 5th Earl Fitzwilliam, he was returned unopposed.

At the 1830 general election, promising to support ministers when "their measures entitled them", he was returned unopposed and was listed by ministers as "bad doubtfuls". In the House of Commons, he voted against the civil list, and then sponsored a "very short and tolerably mild" against a repeal of the Acts of Union 1800, later pushing for the reintroduction of the acts to suppress seditious meetings. He noted that popular meetings could "not be held without the permission of the local authorities". He presented petitions for the abolition of slavery and voted for reform, going into the 1831 general election as a reformer, where he was returned unopposed.

He was returned for Wicklow again at a by-election in 1848—caused by the resignation of William Acton—and held the seat until 1852 when he did not seek re-election.

Baronetcy

He was elevated to the Baronetcy of Bushey Park in 1838, but the baronetcy became extinct upon his death in 1873.

References

External links
 

UK MPs 1826–1830
UK MPs 1830–1831
UK MPs 1831–1832
UK MPs 1835–1837
UK MPs 1837–1841
UK MPs 1841–1847
UK MPs 1847–1852
Whig (British political party) MPs for Irish constituencies
Baronets in the Baronetage of the United Kingdom
1801 births
1873 deaths
People educated at Eton College
Alumni of Brasenose College, Oxford